Dutch nobility is regulated by act of law in the Wet op de adeldom (Law Regarding Nobility, passed into law on May 10, 1994) and is overseen by the  (High Council of Nobility), an official state institution of the Kingdom of the Netherlands.

Before 1814, the history of nobility was separate for each of the Dutch provinces. In the Early Middle Ages, there were, in each province, a number of feudal lords who often were just as powerful, and sometimes more so, than the rulers themselves. In old times, no title other than knight existed.

In the middle of the fourteenth century, quarrels between the feudal lords reduced many families and castles to ruins, contributing to the Dukes of Burgundys' acquisition by conquest or inheritance of many of the provinces forming the Kingdom of the Netherlands.

In 1581, representatives of the Seven Provinces abjured Philip II of Spain, heir of the Dukes of Burgundy. This left a great part of the executive and legislative power to the Ridderschap (knightly estate) of each province, which consisted of the representatives of those families of the old feudal nobility.

In 1795, the Batavian Revolution did away with their power, and it was not before 1813, when William I became King of the Netherlands, that they were again given power in another form. Still, by the time of the constitution of 1848, they had no influence in government affairs.

In 1813, if no higher title was recognised, the men only were to bear the hereditary predicate of Jonkheer. Some old feudal families obtained the title of Baron or Baroness for all their descendants.

Older nobility, having been granted their titles by either the Holy Roman Emperors or French Kings long before 1813, held their pre-existent titles, which were confirmed in the new Kingdom of the Netherlands (such as the families Bentinck, Limburg Stirum and Van Rechteren). In some of these families it is more usual that only the oldest male descendant bears the family title while other descendants bear the predicate of Jonkheer (m) or Jonkvrouw (f).

Princes/Princesses
 Van Oranje-Nassau; members of the royal house are Prince of the Netherlands and/or Prince of Orange-Nassau  
 De Bourbon de Parme,  
 De Riquet de Caraman; the head of the family is the Prince of Chimay  
 Wellesley; the Duke of Wellington in the peerage of the United Kingdom also holds the Dutch & Belgian title Prince of Waterloo

Dukes/Duchesses 
The title Duke/Duchess (Hertog in Dutch) is no longer in existence in noble families of the Kingdom of the Netherlands in this day and age.

Marquises/Marquesses 
 Le Poer Trench; the Earl of Clancarty in the peerage of Ireland is the Marquis of Heusden,    
 D'Auxy
 Van Hoensbroeck (this family left the Netherlands in the 19th century. Known in Germany as Graf von und zu Hoensbroech, the head of this family bears the titles of Marquis and Count von und zu Hoensbroech) 
 Van Eeden, Earl (Graaf) van Mijnsheerenland, Baron van Moerkerken-Damme, and Viscount (Burggraaf) van Binnenmaas. The family was established in the 15th century from French, Belgian and Dutch ancestries in the province of South Holland. They acquired their status of nobility during the time of William III of Orange and became one of the most influential families of the Dutch Royal Court. In the late 17th century the family branched out and migrated to Belgium and Germany. From the early 18th to 19th century, many members of the family emigrated and established themselves in North America and South Africa. The family no longer holds official lands or positions at the Dutch Royal court or within the government. The current Marquise van Eeden resides in the United Kingdom

Counts/Countesses 
 D'Auxy
 Bentinck van Aldenburg  
 Van den Bosch
 Van Bylandt  
 Dumonceau
 Van der Duyn
 Festetics de Tolna
 De Ficquelmont / De Ficquelmont de Vijle  
 De Geloes
 Van der Goltz
 Van Heerdt
 Van Heiden
 De Hochepied
 Van Hoensbroeck 
 Van Hogendorp 
 Van Limburg Stirum  
 Van Lynden  
 De Marchant et d'Ansembourg
 De Norman et d'Audenhove
 Von Oberndorff
 Van Oijen
 Van Oranje-Nassau van Amsberg; members of this family are Count of Oranje-Nassau as well Jonkheer van Amsberg 
 De Perponcher Sedlnitsky
 Von Quadt
 Van Randwijck
 Von Ranzow
 Van Rechteren / Van Rechteren Limpurg  
 van Renesse (extinct since 1855)
 De Riquet de Caraman
 Schimmelpenninck 
 Zu Stolberg-Stolberg
 Van Wassenaer  
 Wolff Metternich
 Van Zuylen van Nijevelt

Viscounts/Viscountesses 
  (Viscount of Nieuport)
 Du Bus
 Roest van Alkemade

Barons/Baronesses 

 d'Ablaing van Giessenburg (extinct in the Netherlands)(Now prominent in the US)

 Van Aerssen Beijeren van Voshol  
 Van Asbeck
 d'Aulnis de Bourouill
 Baud
 Bentinck 
 van Blommestein
 Van Boetzelaer 
 Van der Borch van Verwolde
 Van der Borch tot Verwolde
 Van der Borch tot Verwolde van Vorden
 Van der Borch genaamd van Rouwenoort
 Brantsen
 Van Breugel
 Calkoen
 Van der Capellen
 Van Coeverden
 Collot d'Escury
 Constant de Rebecque
 Creutz
 Van Dedem
 Driehuis
 Dibbets
 Van Doorn
 Van Dorth tot Medler
 Du Bus (extinct since 1976)
 Van Eck
 Van der Feltz
 Van Geen
 De Geer
 Gericke
 Gevers
 De Girard de Mielet van Coehoorn
 Groeninx van Zoelen
 Van Haersolte
 Van Haersolte van Haerst
 Van Hangest d'Yvoy
 Van Hardenbroek
 Van Harinxma thoe Slooten
 Van Heeckeren  
 Van Heemstra  
 Van Heerdt
 Van Hemert tot Dingshof
 De Heusch
 Van der Heyden
 Van der Heyden van Doornenburg
 Van Hogendorp
 Van Hövell / Van Hövell tot Westerflier / Van Hövell van Wezeveld en Westerflier
 Huyssen van Kattendijke
 Van Imhoff
 Van Isselmuden
 Van Ittersum
 De Keverberg (extinct since 1928)
 Van Knobelsdorff
 De Kock
 Krayenhoff
 Lampsins
 Van Lamsweerde
  Van Lawick 
 Van Loo
 Van Pabst
 Lewe van Aduard
 De Loë
 Van Lynden  
 Mackay of Ophemert and Zennewijnen (see Lord Reay, Baronet of Strathnaver, and Chief of Clan Mackay)
 Melvill van Carnbee
 Michiels
 Mollerus
 Van Nagell
 Nahuys
 Van Oldeneel tot Oldenzeel
 D'Olne (extinct since ca. 1890)
 Van Pallandt
 Prisse
 Rasmijn
 Van Raders
 Van Reede
 Rengers, van Welderen
 Van Rijckevorsel
 Röell
 Sandberg 
 Schimmelpenninck van der Oije
 Thoe Schwartzenberg en Hohenlansberg
 Sirtema van Grovestins
 Six
 Van Slingelandt
 Sloet / Sloet van Oldruitenborgh / Sloet tot Everlo / Sloet tot Lindenhorst
 De Smeth
 Snouckaert van Schauburg
 Speyart van Woerden
 Steengracht
 Stratenus
 Sweerts de Landas
 Van Sytzama
 Taets van Amerongen / Taets van Amerongen van Renswoude
 Van Till
 Van Tuyll van Serooskerken
 Van Verschuer
 Van Voorst tot Voorst  
 De Vos van Steenwijk
 Van Vredenburch
 Van Wassenaer / Van Wassenaer van Catwijck  
 De Weichs de Wenne
 De Wijkerslooth de Weerdesteijn
 Van Wijnbergen
 Wittert
 Van Zuylen van Nijevelt

Hereditary knights/Jonkvrouwen
 De Behr (extinct 1954)
 De Bye (also: Van der Does de Bye)
 Van Citters
 Von Devivere
 Du Bus (extinct 1976)
 Van der Heim (extinct 1898)
 Huyssen van Kattendijke
 Van Lockhorst (extinct 1921)
 De Maurissens
 Pauw
 De Plevits
 
 Van der Renne (extinct 1964)
 Van Rosenthal
 De van der Schueren
 De Stuers
 De Thier
 Van Westreenen van Tiellandt (extinct 1848)

Jonkheren/Jonkvrouwen 
Jonkheer/Jonkvrouw

 Alberda van Ekenstein
 Van Oranje-Nassau van Amsberg; members of this family are Count of Oranje-Nassau as well Jonkheer van Amsberg 
 Van Andringa de Kempenaer
 Van Asch van Wijck
 Van Baerdt van Sminia
 Von Balluseck
 Barnaart
 Barnaart van Bergen
 De Beaufort 
 Beelaerts van Blokland
 Van Beijma
 Van Beijma thoe Kingma
 Van Benthem van den Bergh / Van den Berch van Heemstede
 Van Beresteyn
 Van den Bergh
 Backer
 De Beaufort / Godin de Beaufort
 Den Beer Poortugael
 Bicker  
 Bloys van Treslong
 Boddaert
 Boogaert / Van Adrichem Boogaert
 Boreel
 Van den Bosch
 Bosch van Drakestein
 De Bosch Kemper
 Von Bose
 Bowier
 :nl:Van den Brandeler
 De Brauw
 Von Chrismar 
 Calkoen
 Changuion
 Van Citters
 Dedel
 Van der Does
 Van der Does de Willebois
 Van Doorn
 Elias
 Van den Eynde
 Van Eys
 Van Eysinga
 Feith
 Flugi van Aspermont
 Van Foreest
 Van Geen
 De Geer / Van Lintelo de Geer
 Von Geusau / Alting van Geusau / Valckenier von Geusau
 Gevaerts
 Gevers / Gevers Deynoot / Gevers van Endegeest / Gevers Leuven
 Von Ghycze
 De Girard de Mielet van Coehoorn
 Van der Goes / Van der Goes van Naters
 Goldman
 Graafland / Hooft Graafland / Hooft Graafland van Schotervlieland
 De Graeff  
 Graswinckel
 Greven
 Groeninx van Zoelen
 Van Grotenhuis van Onstein
 Gülcher (noble branch extinct)
 Van Haeften
 Van Haersma de With
 Van Heemskerck van Beest
 Hesselt van Dinter
 Van Heurn
 Van der Hoeven
 Van Holthe / Van Holthe tot Echten
 Hooft
 Hooft van Woudenberg
 Van Humalda van Eysinga
 Huydecoper / Huydecoper van Nigtevecht
 Van Iddekinge
 Jankovich de Jeszenice
 De Jong van Beek en Donk
 De Jonge / De Jonge van Campens Nieuwland / De Jonge van Ellemeet / De Jonge van Zwijnsbergen
 Just de la Paisières
 Van Karnebeek
 van der Kelen
 Kenessey de Kenese
 Van Kinschot
 De Kock
 Kreutzwendedich von dem Borne
 De Kuyper
 De la Court
 De Lange
 Van Lawick
 Van Lawick van Pabst
 Leijssius
 Van Lennep
 Van Lidth de Jeude 
 Van Loon
 Loudon
 Lycklama à Nijeholt
 Van der Maessen de Sombreff
 De Marees van Swinderen
 Martens van Sevenhoven
 Martini Buys
 Van der Meer de Walcheren
 Merkes van Gendt
 Meyer
 Michiels
 Van der Mieden / Van der Mieden van Opmeer
 Mock
 Mollerus
 Von Mühlen
 De Muralt
 Nahuys
 Van Nispen tot Pannerden /Van Nispen tot Sevenaer
 van Oordt
 Op ten Noort
 Van Panhuys
 De Pesters
 Ploos van Amstel
 Van de Poll 
 Plompe van Meerdervoort
 Prins
 Prisse
 Quarles de Quarles / Quarles van Ufford
 Quintus
 Van Raab van Canstein
 De Ranitz
 Reigersman
 Rengers Hora Siccama
 Repelaer / Repelaer van Driel
 Rethaan Macaré
 Reuchlin
 Van Riemsdijk
 Van Rijckevorsel
 Röell
 De Rotte
 De Roy van Zuidewijn
 Rutgers van Rozenburg
 Sandberg / Sandberg van Boelens / Sandberg tot Essenburg
 Van Santen
 Van Staden
 Van Sasse van Ysselt
 De Savornin Lohman
 Schimmelpenninck
 Von Schmidt auf Altenstadt
 Schorer
 De Serière
 Serraris
 Sicking(h)e
 Six
 Van Sminia
 Smissaert
 Smits van Oyen
 Snoeck
 Snouck Hurgronje
 Speelman
 Spengler
 Van Spengler
 Stoop
 Storm van 's-Gravesande
 Stratenus
 Strick van Linschoten
 Van Suchtelen / Van Suchtelen van de Haare
 Teding van Berkhout
 Testa
 Van Tets
 Tjarda van Starkenborgh Stachouwer
 Des Tombe
 Trip / Laman Trip / Van Vierssen Trip
 Tulleken
 Vegelin van Claerbergen
 Verheyen
 Versélewel de Witt Hamer
 De Villeneuve
 Van Vliet 
 Van Vredenburch
 Van Weede / Van Weede van Dijkveld
 Wesselman van Helmond
 Wichers / Van Buttingha Wichers
 De Wijkerslooth de Weerdesteijn
 Wittert van Hoogland
 Wladimiroff
 Van der Wyck

See also 
 Regenten
 List of Dutch patrician families

References

Sources 
 Melville de Massue, Marquis de Ruvigny, The Nobilities of Europe, Adamant Media Corporation, 2000

External links 
 List of all noble families in the Netherlands from 1814 till present 

 
Dutch noble